Urmia Shahid Bakeri International Airport  is an airport serving the Central District of Urmia County, West Azerbaijan Province, Iran.

Airlines and destinations

Accidents and incidents

On January 9, 2011, Iran Air Flight 277 crashed after a go-around was initiated during final approach in bad weather conditions, killing 77.

References

External links
 
 

Airports in Iran
Transportation in West Azerbaijan Province
Buildings and structures in Urmia